Just Dance 2015 is a 2014 dance video game developed by Ubisoft Paris, Ubisoft Milan, Ubisoft Reflections, Ubisoft Pune and Ubisoft Bucharest and published by Ubisoft. The sixth main installment of the Just Dance series, it was announced at Ubisoft's E3 2014 press event on 9 June 2014 alongside Just Dance Now—a web-based spin-off of the franchise. It was released for PlayStation 3, PlayStation 4, Xbox 360, Xbox One, Wii, and Wii U on 21 October 2014 in North America, 23 October in Europe, 24 October in the UK and 25 October in Asia.

The game introduced additional social networking features to the series, including the ability for players to challenge other players online, and submit clips of themselves playing for inclusion into crowdsourced "Community Remix" routines featured in-game. The game also added the ability for a smartphone to be used as a controller with a companion app.

Just Dance 2015 received mostly positive reviews by critics, praising the franchise's continued focus on casual audience through its forgiving motion detection, multiplayer functionality, and pop-oriented soundtrack, although criticism was directed at the soundtrack for focusing too much on teen pop, as well as its user interface for having confusing and irregular conventions. As of 31 December 2014, the game has sold four million copies worldwide.

Gameplay

As in previous installments, players must mimic the routine of an on-screen dancer to a chosen song, scoring points based on their accuracy. As with the spin-off Just Dance Now, Just Dance 2015 on the PlayStation 4 and Xbox One allows a smartphone to be used as a controller with a companion app, as an alternative to requiring a console's own motion control accessories. Motions are detected through the phone using its internal sensors.

A new "challenge" feature allows players to send and receive challenges to and from other players as ghost data. The new "Just Dance Wall" feature allows players to view news and updates, including received challenges. The online "World Dance Floor" mode introduced in Just Dance 2014 returned with new features, including 8 player parties for the Wii version (The Xbox 360 and PS3 versions of Just Dance 2014 only have 8 player parties), and VIPs (which is also available outside of the "World Dance Floor" mode, as the same style as "Community Remixes" in the main game mode, while the Wii version doesn't featured a pre-recorded video in the "World Dance Floor" mode), along with the "AutoDance" video creator, while Just Sweat was dropped in favor of an optional k/cal tracker, and the return of the "Non-Stop Shuffle" feature in the playlists menu. Also, difficulty ratings have been removed. Players could also submit clips of their own gameplay for a chance to be incorporated into a "Community Remix"—routines for selected songs that feature a compilation of player videos in place of the rendered dancers. The "Party Master" mode, returning from Just Dance 2014, is now a Wii U exclusive mode, as it is removed from the Xbox One version. Pictures of coaches from the first three main games in the Just Dance series have been remade using its original designs from these games.

All online services for the game were discontinued on 19 November 2018.

The Chinese version features a unique tweak to the traditional karaoke-styled lyrics, in which has a glowing circle that's pulsing to the beat and is next to the highlighted lyrics.

Soundtrack
The soundtrack of Just Dance 2015 includes 45 songs spanning across various genres. Geoffroy Sardin, Ubisoft EMEA's senior vice president of marketing, explained that the soundtrack was intended to contain "more top Billboard artists than ever before", citing demand by players.

Notes: 
"Dancing Queen" by ABBA was planned to be featured in the game, but was scrapped for unknown reasons. It was later brought back in Just Dance 2018 as a Just Dance Unlimited exclusive.
The original version of "You Never Can Tell" by Chuck Berry was meant to appear in the game, but was taken out for an unknown reason. It made a return to Just Dance 2016 as an "A. Caveman & The Backseats" cover version instead.

Downloadable content

Additional songs for Just Dance 2015 were released as downloadable content. Some DLC songs were re-issues of songs released as DLC for previous editions.

The game offers downloadable content songs for the player to download. One of them is free of charge.

All of the DLC songs are no longer available for the Wii because of the closure of the Wii Shop Channel.

Reception
Just Dance 2015 received mixed-to-positive reviews by critics; Metacritic lists the Xbox One version of the game with an aggregate score of 70 out of 100 based on 17 critic reviews, the PlayStation 4 version of the game with an aggregate score of 72 out of 100 based on 8 critic reviews, and the Wii U version of the game with an aggregate score of 75 out of 100 based on 6 critic reviews.

Zack Stein of IGN gave the Xbox One version of Just Dance 2015 an 8.0 out of 10; describing the game as "a welcome, surprising reinvigoration of the series", Stein praised the game for continuing to provide an overall experience catered to a casual audience, jump-in multiplayer, along with improved Kinect motion tracking in-game, and the higher-quality production of the per-song background videos, but criticized the user interface for being "as confusing and frustrating as ever" due to irregular design choices and behaviors. In conclusion, Stein felt that "It would be easy to dismiss Just Dance 2015 as the 'same-old-same-old,' but that would overlook this finely tuned party game’s special-effects-laden dance numbers, complete with chorus lines and elaborate sets and costumes, and the social integration that holds the world-wide Just Dance community together."

Game Revolution, giving the game a 3 out of 5, felt that the game's soundtrack was "high-energy" albeit catered to a casual audience, noting that "singles like Pharrell's 'Happy' provide a strong pop basis while oddballs like a Tetris track or an unfortunately obnoxious song about a fox explore the far reaches of danceable contemporary music." Still, Just Dance 2015 was praised for its forgiving motion detection and multiplayer experience, concluding that "of my own preferences regarding the music genre, dancing remains somewhere out of the lead when it comes to interacting with sound and visuals, though Just Dance 2015 hits on every requirement I have from anything asking me to move my feet without a pad to stomp on."

Steve Hannley of Hardcore Gamer was more critical of Just Dance 2015, arguing that it did not provide enough differentiation over Just Dance 2014 to be described as anything more than a "track pack". Hannley felt that the game's social features, although well-designed, would not appeal to what he believed was the game's target audience (those playing the game for exercise, not wanting to dance in public, or are "underage"). The game's soundtrack was also criticized for being the worst in series history for "clearly catering to teeny boppers and in doing so [leaving] out practically anybody older than 21 with decent taste in music", and containing fewer "good" songs than 2014. In conclusion, giving the game a 3 out of 5, Hannley argued that "Just Dance is a series that's hard to hate as it genuinely wants players to have a good time, but 2015 is a misstep. Hardly anything has changed and practically nothing has for those who don’t partake in the online functionality".

As of 31 December 2014 Just Dance 2015 has shipped 4 million copies.

References

External links

2014 video games
Dance video games
Fitness games
Just Dance (video game series)
Kinect games
Music video games
PlayStation 3 games
PlayStation 4 games
PlayStation Move-compatible games
Ubisoft games
Video games developed in France
Video games developed in Italy
Wii games
Wii U games
Wii U eShop games
Xbox 360 games
Xbox One games